Mandrocleides was an influential follower of Agis IV of Sparta's reforms re-establishing the institutions of Lycurgus in the 3rd century BC.

3rd-century BC Spartans